Bennettville may refer to:
Bennetville, former name of Dutton, Ontario, Canada
Bennettville, California
Bennettville, Minnesota

See also
Bennettsville, Indiana
Bennettsville, South Carolina